Rainer Schmidt (born 1 August 1948 in Langewiesen, Thuringia) is an East German former ski jumper who competed from 1972 to 1976. He won the bronze medal in the individual large hill competition at the 1972 Winter Olympics in Sapporo.

Schmidt won the Four Hills Tournament in 1973 and earned a silver medal at the FIS Ski-Flying World Championships in 1975.

References

 

1948 births
Living people
People from Langewiesen
German male ski jumpers
Olympic ski jumpers of East Germany
Ski jumpers at the 1972 Winter Olympics
Olympic medalists in ski jumping
Sportspeople from Thuringia
Medalists at the 1972 Winter Olympics
Olympic bronze medalists for East Germany
Universiade medalists in ski jumping
Universiade bronze medalists for East Germany
Competitors at the 1970 Winter Universiade